Albert Burdon (4 July 1900–13 April 1981) was a British actor and comedian, 

He was born in South Shields, County Durham.  He started his career playing in provincial revues, and was spotted by C. B. Cochran who gave him a part in the Rodgers and Hart musical Ever Green at the Adelphi Theatre in London in 1930.  

Although he was described by Roy Hudd as "a master of physical comedy", Burdon never became a star in London, though he did take prominent roles in a series of pantomimes at the Lyceum Theatre in the 1930s.   He made nine films, including It's a Boy (1933), and continued to perform on stage until the late 1950s, in later years with his son, Bryan Burdon.

Personal life and death
Burdon married Violet Spurgin in 1933. The marriage produced two children. His son Bryan Burdon became an actor and his daughter Paula Burdon became a TV Producer. Albert Burdon died in South Shields in 1981, aged 80.

Filmography

The Maid of the Mountains (1932)
Letting in the Sunshine (1933)
It's a Boy (1933)
Heat Wave (1935)
She Knew What She Wanted (1936)
Oh Boy! (1938)
Luck of the Navy (1938)
Jailbirds (1940)

References

External links

1900 births
1981 deaths
English male stage actors
English male film actors
People from South Shields
Male actors from Tyne and Wear
Comedians from Tyne and Wear
20th-century English male actors